Chijioke "Chukie" Obinna Nwokorie (born July 10, 1975) is a former American football defensive end.

Early years
Chukie Nwokorie was adopted as a teenager by John and Patricia Stephenson of Lafayette, Indiana after his birth father departed for Nigeria and his birth mother proved unable to care for him. Brought into the Stephenson family (three sons and a daughter), he finally found the family he had never had. He played high school football at Jefferson High School in Lafayette, Indiana where he received honorable mention and All State Selection in 1994. He notched 88 career tackles with 8.5 sacks, four forced fumbles and three fumble recoveries.

College career
He played college football at Purdue University where he was a four-year letter winner and a one-year starter.

NFL career
Nwokorie entered the National Football League for the Indianapolis Colts (1999–2002) signing as a free agent. He also played for the Green Bay Packers (2003–2004).

AFL career
Nwokorie played two seasons in the Arena Football League with the Las Vegas Gladiators (2006) and the Grand Rapids Rampage (2007).

Personal
He served as an intern in the enforcement department of the NCAA in 2001.  He currently lives in Indianapolis, Indiana with his wife, Jamila.  He also had a stint in 2004–2005 as an intern at a local radio station in Indianapolis, WNOU with the Morning Mess.

Former Colts player in court
http://www.wthr.com/article/former-colts-player-in-court

He is currently working in business development.

References

External links
NFL stats from pro-football-reference.com
AFL stats from arenafan.co

1975 births
Living people
Sportspeople from Tuskegee, Alabama
African-American players of American football
American football offensive linemen
American football defensive ends
American sportspeople of Nigerian descent
Purdue University alumni
Purdue Boilermakers football players
Indianapolis Colts players
Green Bay Packers players
Las Vegas Gladiators players
Grand Rapids Rampage players
Sportspeople from Lafayette, Indiana
Players of American football from Alabama
Players of American football from Indiana
21st-century African-American sportspeople
20th-century African-American sportspeople